The European New Car Assessment Programme (Euro NCAP) is a European voluntary car safety performance assessment programme (i.e. a New Car Assessment Program) based in Leuven (Belgium) formed in 1996, with the first results released in February 1997. It was originally started by the Transport Research Laboratory for the UK Department for Transport, but later backed by several European governments, as well as by the European Union. Their slogan is "For Safer Cars".

History and activities
Euro NCAP is a voluntary vehicle safety rating system created by the Swedish Road Administration, the Fédération Internationale de l'Automobile and International Consumer Research & Testing, backed by 14 members, and motoring & consumer organisations in several EU countries. They provide European consumers with information regarding the safety of passenger vehicles. In 1998, operations moved from London to Brussels.
It was supported by people like Max Mosley.

The programme is modelled after the New Car Assessment Program, introduced  1979 by the US National Highway Traffic Safety Administration.
Other areas with similar (but not identical) programmes include Australia and New Zealand with ANCAP, Latin America with Latin NCAP and China with C-NCAP.

They publish safety reports on new cars, and awards 'star ratings' based on the performance of the vehicles in a variety of crash tests, including front, side and pole impacts, and impacts with pedestrians.

Testing is not mandatory, with vehicle models either being independently chosen by Euro NCAP or sponsored by the manufacturers. In Europe, new cars are certified as legal for sale under the Whole Vehicle Type Approval regimen that differs from Euro NCAP. According to Euro NCAP, "The frontal and side impact crash tests used by Euro NCAP are based on those used in European legislation. However, much higher performance requirements are used by Euro NCAP. Euro NCAP also states that "Legislation sets a minimum compulsory standard whilst Euro NCAP is concerned with best possible current practice. Progress with vehicle safety legislation can be slow, particularly as all EU Member States’ views have to be taken into account. Also, once in place, legislation provides no further incentive to improve, whereas Euro NCAP provides a continuing incentive by regularly enhancing its assessment procedures to stimulate further improvements in vehicle safety."

Before Euro NCAP was introduced car buyers had little information if one car was safer than the other; in fact the UK at the time required only a  frontal crash test. The first ratings of a group of best selling vehicles were released in 1997, since then Euro NCAP has tested more than 1,800 new cars, published over 600 ratings and has helped save upwards of 78,000 lives in Europe and encouraged manufacturers to build safer cars.  The result of Euro NCAP is that over the years, European automakers' cars have become much safer. Test results are commonly presented by motor press, and in turn, greatly influence consumer demand for a vehicle. One notable example of this is the Rover 100 (an update of a 1980 design, first marketed as an Austin ), which after receiving a one-star Adult Occupant Rating in the tests in 1997, suffered from poor sales and was withdrawn from production soon afterwards: it was the 'What Car' car of the year, for 1980. BMW's 2007 MINI, for example, had its bonnet and headlamp fixture changed to meet the latest pedestrian safety requirements. In 2017, to celebrate Euro NCAP's 20th anniversary, they tested a 1997 Rover 100 and 2017 Honda Jazz under the same frontal offset conditions to demonstrate how far safety has come in Europe.

2020 test procedures 
A full test can take up to 6 weeks:

Mobile progressive deformable barrier 
The test car is propelled at  into a moving deformable barrier mounted on an oncoming 1400 kg trolley, also travelling at 50 km/h at a 50% overlap. This represents hitting a mid-size family car. Two adult male dummies are seated in the front (a THOR-50M driver and a Hybrid-III 50M passenger) and two child dummies (a 6 year old and a 10 year old) are placed in the back. The aim is to assess the crumple zones and the compatibility of the test car.

Full width rigid barrier 
A small 5th Percentile dummy is seated in the driving position and in the rear seat. The aim is to test the car's restraint system, such as airbags and seat belts.

Mobile side impact barrier 
A deformable barrier is mounted on a trolley and is driven at  into the side of the stationary test vehicle at a right angle. This is meant to represent another vehicle colliding with the side of a car.

Side pole 
The car is propelled sideways at  against a rigid, narrow pole at a small angle away from perpendicular to simulate a vehicle travelling sideways into roadside objects such as a tree or pole.

Far side impact 
The body in white (frame) of the vehicle is attached to a sled is propelled sideways to provide accelerations experienced by the vehicle in the side and pole tests, but on the far side of the vehicle. The far side testing was implemented in 2020 to help combat far side injuries (where the driver is struck from the opposite side).  The ‘excursion’ of the dummy - the extent to which the dummy moves towards the impacted side of the vehicle - is measured.

If the vehicle is equipped with centre airbags then a co-driver (front passenger) is added in either the mobile side impact or the pole test to evaluate its effectiveness.

Whiplash 
The vehicle seat is propelled forwards rapidly at both  to test the seat and head restraint's capabilities to protect the head and neck against whiplash during a rear impact.

Vulnerable road users (pedestrians and cyclists) 
Head impact
Upper leg impact
Lower leg impact
AEB pedestrian
AEB cyclist

Source

Safety Assist 
AEB car-to-car
Occupant status monitoring
Speed assistance
Lane support
Source

Rescue and extrication 
How easy it is for first responders to extricate the occupant and how well eCall performs after a collision.

Ratings 
Euro NCAP's ratings consist of percentage scores for Adult Occupant, Child Occupant, Vulnerable Road Users and Safety Assist and are delivered in the overall rating of stars, 5 being the best and 0 being the worst.

5 star safety: Overall excellent performance in crash protection and well equipped with comprehensive and robust crash avoidance technology
4 star safety: Overall good performance in crash protection and all round; additional crash avoidance technology may be present
3 star safety: At least average occupant protection but not always equipped with the latest crash avoidance features
2 star safety: Nominal crash protection but lacking crash avoidance technology
1 star safety: Marginal crash protection and little in the way of crash avoidance technology
0 star safety: Meeting type-approval standards so can legally be sold but lacking critical modern safety technology

Some cars have dual ratings as the lower is for the vehicle with standard equipment, while the higher is for the vehicle when equipped with certain options, often in the form of a safety pack.

NCAP ratings are valid for a region. Some cars have less standard equipment as imported by other countries.

Euro NCAP Advanced

Euro NCAP Advanced is a reward system launched in 2010 for advanced safety technologies, complementing Euro NCAP's existing star rating scheme. Euro NCAP rewards and recognises car manufacturers that make available new safety technologies which demonstrate a scientifically proven safety benefit for consumers and society, but are not yet considered in the star rating By rewarding technologies, Euro NCAP provides an incentive to manufacturers to accelerate the standard fitment of important safety equipment across their model ranges.

Rating history 
1997 – first crash tests of offset deformable barrier test and side impact

2003 – New child protection rating

2008 – Whiplash tests introduced

2010 – Euro NCAP Advance Award introduced

2011 – ESC included in vehicle rating

2014 – AEB included into the rating

2015
 Side impact "upgraded"
 January - Full width rigid barrier test introduced
 November - AEB for pedestrians included

2016
 January – New child dummies introduced
 April – Dual rating introduced

2018 – AEB included cyclists

2020

 MPDB and far side crash tests introduced
 Offset deformable barrier discontinued
 AEB reverse and AEB Turn Across Path introduced

Source

Comparison groups 
The results are grouped into 11 increasingly demanding classes:

 Pre-2009 (archive)
 2009
 2010-2011
 2012
 2013
 2014
 2015
 2016-2017
 2018-2019
 2020-2022
 2023-2024

Quadricycle Ratings 
There is a different quadricycle rating for four-wheeled micro cars.

Members and test facilities 

There are many members and test facilities throughout Europe.

Members 

 ADAC
 German Federal Ministry of Transport and Digital Infrastructure
 UK Department for Transport
 Dutch Ministry of Infrastructure and Water Management
 Luxembourgish Ministry of the Economy
 Government of Catalonia
 International Consumer Research & Testing
 FIA
 Swedish Transport Administration
 Thatcham Research
 French Ministry for the Ecological Transition
 Automobile Club d'Italia
 DEKRA Automobil

Testing facilities 

 Thatcham Research
 ADAC Technik Zentrum
 BASt
 TNO
 UTAC CERAM
 IDIADA AT
 CSI
 AstaZero
 Mira China
 China Automotive Engineering Research Institute

See also

General
 Automobile safety rating
 Car classification
 Car safety
 Road safety
 Crumple zone

Safety organisations
 Transport Research Laboratory
 World Forum for Harmonization of Vehicle Regulations
 National Highway Traffic Safety Administration
 Insurance Institute for Highway Safety

References

External links

 | The European New Car Assessment Programme
European New Car Assessment Programme

  

New Car Assessment Programs
Consumer organisations in Belgium
1996 establishments in Belgium